The drongos are a family, Dicruridae, of passerine birds of the Old World tropics. The 30 species in the family are placed in a single genus, Dicrurus.

Drongos are mostly black or dark grey, short-legged birds, with an upright stance when perched. They have forked tails and some have elaborate tail decorations. They feed on insects and small birds, which they catch in flight or on the ground. Some species are accomplished mimics and have a variety of alarm calls, to which other birds and animals often respond. They are known to utter fake alarm calls that scare other animals off food, which the drongo then claims.

Taxonomy
The genus Dicrurus was introduced by French ornithologist Louis Pierre Vieillot for the drongos in 1816. The type species was subsequently designated as the balicassiao (Dicrurus balicassius) by English zoologist George Robert Gray in 1841. The name of the genus combines the Ancient Greek words dikros "forked" and oura "tail". "Drongo" is originally from the indigenous language of Madagascar, where it refers to local species; it is now used for all members of the family.

This family now includes only the genus Dicrurus, although Christidis and Boles (2007) expanded the family to include the subfamilies Rhipidurinae (Australasian fantails), Monarchinae (monarch and paradise flycatchers), and Grallininae (magpie larks).

The family was formerly treated as having two genera, Chaetorhynchus and Dicrurus. The genus Chaetorhynchus contains a single species, the New Guinea-endemic C. papuensis. On the basis of both morphological and genetic differences, it is now placed with the fantails (Rhipiduridae) and renamed from the pygmy drongo to the drongo fantail.

The genus Dicrurus contains 30 species:
 Common square-tailed drongo, Dicrurus ludwigii – formerly square-tailed drongo
 Western square-tailed drongo, Dicrurus occidentalis – first described in 2018
 Sharpe's drongo, Dicrurus sharpei – split from D. ludwigii
 Shining drongo, Dicrurus atripennis
 Fork-tailed drongo, Dicrurus adsimilis
 Glossy-backed drongo, Dicrurus divaricatus – split from fork-tailed drongo
 Velvet-mantled drongo, Dicrurus modestus
 Fanti drongo, Dicrurus atactus – split from velvet-mantled drongo
 Grand Comoro drongo, Dicrurus fuscipennis
 Aldabra drongo, Dicrurus aldabranus
 Crested drongo, Dicrurus forficatus
 Mayotte drongo, Dicrurus waldenii
 Black drongo, Dicrurus macrocercus
 Ashy drongo, Dicrurus leucophaeus
 White-bellied drongo, Dicrurus caerulescens
 Crow-billed drongo, Dicrurus annectens
 Bronzed drongo, Dicrurus aeneus
 Lesser racket-tailed drongo, Dicrurus remifer
 Balicassiao, Dicrurus balicassius
 Hair-crested drongo, Dicrurus hottentottus
 Tablas drongo, Dicrurus menagei – split from hair-crested drongo
 Palawan drongo, Dicrurus palawanensis – split from hair-crested drongo
 Sumatran drongo, Dicrurus sumatranus – split from hair-crested drongo
 Wallacean drongo, Dicrurus densus – split from hair-crested drongo
 Sulawesi drongo, Dicrurus montanus
 Spangled drongo, Dicrurus bracteatus
 Paradise drongo, Dicrurus megarhynchus
 Andaman drongo, Dicrurus andamanensis
 Greater racket-tailed drongo, Dicrurus paradiseus
 Sri Lanka drongo, Dicrurus lophorinus – split from paradise drongo

The family Dicruridae is most likely of Indo-Malayan origin, with a colonization of Africa about 15 million years ago (Mya). Dispersal across the Wallace Line into Australasia is estimated to have been more recent, around 6 Mya.

Characteristics

These insectivorous birds are usually found in open forests or bush. Most are black or dark grey in colour, sometimes with metallic tints. They have long, forked tails; some Asian species have elaborate tail decorations. They have short legs and sit very upright whilst perched, like a shrike. They flycatch or take prey from the ground. Some drongos, especially the greater racket-tailed drongo, are noted for their ability to mimic other birds and even mammals.

Two to four eggs are laid in a nest high in a tree. Despite their small size, they are aggressive and fearless, and will attack much larger species if their nests or young are threatened.

Several species of animals and birds respond to drongos' alarm calls, which often warn of the presence of a predator. Fork-tailed drongos in the Kalahari desert use alarm calls in the absence of a predator to cause animals to flee and abandon food, which they eat, getting up to 23% of their food this way. They not only use their own alarm calls, but also imitate those of many species, either their victim's or that of another species to which  the victim responds. If the call of one species is not effective, perhaps because of habituation, the drongo may try another; 51 different calls are known to be imitated. In one test on pied babblers, the babbler ignored an alarm call repeated three times when no danger was present, but continued to respond to different calls. Researchers have considered the possibility that these drongos possess theory of mind, not fully shown in any animal other than humans.

Insult
The word "drongo" is used in Australian English as a mild form of insult meaning "idiot" or "stupid fellow". This usage derives from an Australian racehorse of the same name (apparently after the spangled drongo, D. bracteatus) in the 1920s that never won despite many places. The word also has been frequently used among friends and can be used in a casual or serious tone.

Gallery

References

Further reading

External links

Drongo videos on the Internet Bird Collection

Australian slang